Mateusz Żytko (born November 27, 1982, in Wrocław) is a Polish professional footballer who plays as a centre-back for Piast Żmigród.

Career

Club
In July 2010, he joined Polonia Bytom on a two-year contract deal.

In July 2011, he signed a two-year contract with Cracovia.

References

External links
 
 

Polish footballers
Polonia Bytom players
Polonia Warsaw players
Zagłębie Lubin players
Wisła Płock players
Śląsk Wrocław players
MKS Cracovia (football) players
MKP Pogoń Siedlce players
Ekstraklasa players
I liga players
II liga players
III liga players
1982 births
Living people
Sportspeople from Wrocław
Association football defenders